Lindsay Wilson may refer to:

Lindsay Wilson (rower) (born 1948), New Zealand rower
Lindsay Wilson (soccer) (born 1979), Australian soccer player
Lindsay Wilson (minister), Presbyterian minister in Northern Ireland